Nicolai Nørregaard (born 1 October 1979) is a Danish chef and restaurateur. He is a co-founder and the head chef of Kadeau in Copenhagen and Kadeau Bornholm on the island of Bornholm which have two and one star in the Michelin Guide.

Biography
Nørregaard grew up in Svaneke on the island of Bornholm. He cooked with his grandfather from an early age and met his later business partner Rasmus Kofoed in the local handball club when he was 11. He intended to study architecture but began to work at restaurant Svaneke Pakhus in the summer time and Cofoco in Copenhagen in the winter time. He has no formal education as a chef. In 2007, together with Rasmus Kofoed, he acquired the restaurant Strandhytten which had been put up for sale in Vester Sømark at Pedersker on Bornholm's south coast and opened Kadeau a few months later. In 2011, together with Magnus Kofoed, Nicolai and Rasmus opened Kadeau København in Copenhagen. Kadeau København received one star in the Michelin Guide (Main Cities of Europe) in March 2014 and a second star in 2018. Kadeau Bornholm received a star when the first Michelin Guide Nordic Region was published in 2016 and is holding it since then.

Current activities
Nørregaard is a co-owner and head chef of Kadeau on Bornholm and Kadeau in Copenhagen, which have one and two stars respectively in the Michelin Guide. He is also a co-owner of Ö Skyr, a Bornholm-based producer of skyr.

References

External links
 Official website of Kadeau
 Official website of Pony

1979 births
Danish chefs
Head chefs of Michelin starred restaurants
Danish restaurateurs
People from Bornholm
Living people